St. Anselm's Sr. Sec. School, Mansarovar, Jaipur is a convent educational institution located in Jaipur, Rajasthan, India. It is run by the Gyandeep Education Society. The school was founded by Rev. Fr. Raymond Coelho. It is co-educational, English medium institution. The schools cater for pupils from the ages of 4 through to 17 or 18, and are open to children of all religious denominations. It is a day scholars school and affiliated to the Central Board of Secondary Education, New Delhi.

School patron - St. Anselm

St. Anselm came from a noble Lombard family and was born in Aosta in the Italian Alps. His mother was a good and pious Burgundian, but after her death his father's violence and harshness caused Anselm to flee France. There, after several years of wandering, he took the Benedictine habit in 1060 at Bec (Normandy), where his illustrious countryman Bl. Lanfranc had started a school at the Abbey of Bec. Within three years he was made Prior and after another 15 years, very reluctantly, Abbot.

As an abbot, St. Anselm had to go to England from time to time in connection with his abbey's English properties, and there he became known and highly esteemed for his virtues and zeal. So much that in 1099 he was made Archbishop of Canterbury in the hope that he would be able to cope with the encroachments of King William the Red.

History
The history of St. Anselm's School, mansarovar in Jaipur starts from Ajmer, wherein 1904, the French Capuchin Fathers founded St. Anselm's Ajmer. They adopted St. Anselm's motto for the school: Deo Amabile et hominibus, i.e. "Pleasing to God - pleasing to men."

In 1987 the Diocese of Ajmer-Jaipur wanted to start a similar school in the capital city (Jaipur). For this, they appointed Fr. Raymond Coelho, an educationist. He then founded St. Anselm's Pink City School with some teachers and employees he had recruited.

The school motto is 'ज्योति से ज्योति' i.e. " From Light to Light".

Curriculum
The school follows the Continuous and comprehensive evaluation or CCE, introduced by CBSE, from classes I to X.

For junior classes the subjects are Mathematics, both English and Hindi language and literature, Social Science, Science, Computer Science, Art and Crafts, Writing Skills, Moral Science, Environmental Studies, General Knowledge and Choral singing (the number of subjects varies from one grade to another.)

For middle classes the subjects are Mathematics, English, Hindi & Sanskrit language and literature, Social Science (differentiated into History, Civics And Geography), Science, Computer Science, Art(Drawing), Moral Science, Environmental Studies and General Knowledge

For senior classes the subjects are Mathematics, English & Hindi or Sanskrit language and literature, Social Science (differentiated into History, Civics, Geography, Economics and Disaster Management), Science (differentiated into Chemistry, Biology and Physics), Computer Science, Moral Science and Environmental Studies.

The two streams for senior secondary classes are Commerce, Life Science and Physical Science. The combination of Subjects are -: 
 PCM (Physics, Chemistry & Mathematics) + C++
 PCM + Biology
 PCM + Economics
 PCB (Physics, Chemistry & Biology) + Economics
 Commerce (Account, Entrepreneurship, Business Studies & Economics) + Maths
 Commerce + IP
 PCM + IP
 PCB + IP
 PCB + Entrepreneurship
Classes 10 and 12 are prepared for Central Board of Secondary Education examinations that are held nationwide in march.

Extracurricular
Physical Training - the school has a division National Cadet Corps.
 Games and sports - games include athletics, cricket, basketball, football, volleyball and lawn tennis.
Honing intellectual skills - debates, extempore, creative writing and drawing, singing and instrumental competitions are held yearly. The major intellectual skill measuring event is the Youth Week, when quizzing activities, dramatics, dance and singingcompetitions are held. These competitions are inter-house competitions.

School campus
The school is situated in Mansarovar, a developing colony in Jaipur famous for its Gaurav Tower, Jaipur, and surrounding malls.

It has two buildings, one for the junior and middle school and one for high school. There is a large ground in front of the high school wing and a basketball court besides the junior school wing. The ground is used for assembly and is differentiated into a football ground, a cricket court and volleyball ground. The school has a chapel, a beautiful and quiet place which is visited by the faithful for prayers.

The school has a principal residence behind the new building, and vice-principal and nuns' residences beside the chapel. There is an audio-video room below the chapel and a small playground with swings beside the chapel.

The old building has the following facilities:
A small gathering place with a stage
Principal's office
Office
Staff-room 
Library
Craft room
Computer lab
Two Halls
Dance room
Drawing room
Visitor Center and waiting room

The new building has the following facilities:
Stage
Staffroom
Physics lab
Chemistry lab
Biology lab
Computer lab
Hall

Houses
The school is divided into four houses, for promoting academic and athletic competition among the pupils. The houses are Blue, Red, Green, and Gold. House Captains leads their houses and are aided by vice-captains. Head-boy and Head-girl are elected irrespective of their house.

Anselmite Traditions
Annual Day is held every year usually during February. There is a formal assembly in the afternoon after which there is a speech by a  guest or alumnus and a series of cultural events like drama, dance, and songs sung by the school choir. Prizes are presented for academic excellence and success in extracurricular activities.
Republic Day and Independence Day parades - The four houses and the National Cadet Corps present a march past in front of the principal and chief guest on Indian Republic Day (26 January) and Indian Independence Day (15 August). The national Tricolour is hoisted and the salute is taken by the Chief Guest on the occasion.
School publications - The school publishes a quarterly newsletter The Anselm's Herald, managed and edited by students with the assistance of a staff coordinator.

Principals of St Anselm's Pink City School
Rev. Fr. Raymond Coelho, Founder Principal - 1987-2000 
Rev. Fr. Edward Olievera, Principal - 2000-2006 
Rev. Fr. Paulachan Pulickal, Principal - 2006-2011 
Rev. Fr. Melvin Jobard, Principal - 2011-2014
Rev. Fr. Edward Olievera, Principal - 2014 – 2020
Rev. Fr. Thomas Maniparambil,Principal - 2020–present

Notable alumni
Akshat Singhal - finalist in Intel International Science and Engineering, Asteroid 12599 Singhal named after him.
Rahul Gupta - record holder for highest number of International research papers published by an undergraduate student.
Gaurav Agarwal - Rank-1 in UPSC civil services examination 2013
Aditi Vats - model, Miss India Wild card entry 2014 
Zaid Syed - youtuber

References

Primary schools in India
High schools and secondary schools in Rajasthan
Christian schools in Rajasthan
Schools in Jaipur
Educational institutions established in 1987
1987 establishments in Rajasthan